Liberty County High School is a public high school teaching grades 9–12. The school is located in Bristol, Florida, which is the county seat of Liberty County in the Florida Panhandle near Tallahassee. It is the only high school in Liberty County, with around 325 students from Hosford Junior High in Hosford and W.R. Tolar School in Bristol. The school is operated by the Liberty County School District.

Sports teams

FHSAA Sports:
 Football
 Girls' Volleyball
 Girls' Basketball
 Boys' Basketball
 Softball
 Baseball
 Co-Ed Track and Field

Clubs
 Band
 Senior Beta Club
 FCA (Fellowship of Christian Athletes)
 FCCLA (Family, Career, and Community Leaders of America)
 AJROTC
 HOSA (Health Occupations Students of America)
 Student Council
 FFA (Future Farmers of America)

Notable alumni
 Tim Davis, Former MLB player (Seattle Mariners)
 Tim Young, Former MLB player (Montreal Expos, Boston Red Sox)

References

External links
 LCHS Official Website

Public high schools in Florida
Buildings and structures in Liberty County, Florida
Education in Liberty County, Florida